Valarkavu is a residential area situated in the City of Thrissur in Kerala state of India. Valarkavu is Ward 24 of Thrissur Municipal Corporation.

References

See also
Thrissur
Thrissur District

Suburbs of Thrissur city